HAB may refer to:

 Hab, Cambodia
 Hab River, Pakistan
 Battle of Hab, 1119
 The HAB Theory, a 1976 novel by Allan W. Eckert
 Habrough railway station, England
 Habilitation, a qualification to conduct university teaching 
 Hanoi Sign Language, ISO 639-3 code
 Harmful algal bloom
 High-altitude balloon
 Home Affairs Bureau, Hong Kong
 Hokuriku Asahi Broadcasting, a TV station in Ishikawa Prefecture, Japan
 Hospitality Awarding Body
 Herzog August Bibliothek, a library in Wolfenbüttel, Germany.
 Marion County – Rankin Fite Airport, serving Hamilton, Alabama, US, IATA code

See also 
 Habs (disambiguation)